Rinku Singh is an Indian cricketer who currently plays for the Kolkata Knight Riders in the Indian Premier League and for Uttar Pradesh in domestic cricket. He is a left-handed top order batsman and a right-handed off-spinner.

Early life 
Rinku Singh, 3rd among 5 siblings, was born in a working class family to Khanchandra Singh who worked in an LPG distribution company. He spent early years in a 2 room quarter, near Aligarh Stadium in Aligarh, Uttar Pradesh, provided by his father's employers. During his early years he considered getting a job as sweeper to help his financially strapped family before running away to pursue a career in Cricket.

Domestic career 
He represented Uttar Pradesh at the Under-16, Under-19 and Under-23 levels and Central Zone at the Under-19 level. He made his List A cricket debut for Uttar Pradesh in March 2014 at the age of 16 and top-scored with 83 in that match. He made his first-class debut for Uttar Pradesh in the 2016–17 Ranji Trophy on 5 November 2016.

He was the leading run-scorer for Uttar Pradesh in the group-stage of the 2018–19 Ranji Trophy, with 803 runs in nine matches. He finished the tournament with 953 runs in ten matches.

Indian Premier League 
In February 2017, he was bought by the Kings XI Punjab team for the 2017 Indian Premier League. In January 2018, he was bought with the worth of 80 lakh by the Kolkata Knight Riders in the 2018 IPL auction.

Rinku was ruled out of the 2021 Indian Premier League due to a knee injury and he was later replaced by Gurkeerat Singh Mann. In February 2022, he was bought by the Kolkata Knight Riders in the auction for the 2022 Indian Premier League tournament. In this year's tournament match, he got his first Man of the Match award with a cheque of one lakh for 42 runs in 23 balls with a strike-rate of 182.61 against Rajasthan Royals.

Suspension 
On 30 May 2019, Singh was given a three-month suspension by the Board of Control for Cricket in India (BCCI) after he took part in the Ramadan T20 Tournament in Abu Dhabi without seeking prior permission to play.

References

External links 
 
 
 
 

1997 births
Living people
Indian cricketers
Uttar Pradesh cricketers
Kolkata Knight Riders cricketers
Sportspeople from Aligarh